Artifice was a nonprofit literary magazine based in Chicago, Illinois, that existed between 2009 and 2017.

History and profile
Artifice was started in 2009. It was co-founded by Rebekah Silverman, who served as Managing Editor, and James Tadd Adcox, who served as editor-in-chief. It was published biannually. Later Peter Jurmu became the editor-in-chief of the magazine replacing James Tadd Adcox in the post.

In 2011 Artifice was awarded a City of Chicago Community Arts Assistance Program (CAAP) Grant. In 2010, the magazine was awarded the Best Submission Guidelines by Philistine Press for the Artifice wishlist," which requests such submissions as "3 of the saddest sentences ever written," "1 geometrical proof," "2 fits, 2 starts," "4 labyrinths created using parentheses, footnotes, endnotes, etc," and "something that includes a Greek chorus."

Artifice was a division of Artifice Books, a small press. Artifice Books' first project, released in 2012, was "EXITS ARE," an e-book by Mike Meginnis (and many players), published in conjunction with Uncanny Valley. Later the magazine began to be published annually by Curbside Splendor Publishing. Artifice folded in 2017.

References

External links

Artifice Books 
 WorldCat record

2009 establishments in Illinois
2017 establishments in Illinois
Annual magazines published in the United States
Biannual magazines published in the United States
Defunct literary magazines published in the United States
Magazines established in 2009
Magazines disestablished in 2017
Magazines published in Chicago
Online literary magazines published in the United States
Online magazines with defunct print editions